This list of the Paleozoic life of Ohio contains the various prehistoric life-forms whose fossilized remains have been reported from within the US state of Ohio and are between 538.8 and 252.17 million years of age.

A

 †Abylea – type locality for genus
 †Abylea minuta – type locality for species
 †Acacocrinus
 †Acacocrinus anebos
 †Acanthatia
 †Acanthoclema
 †Acanthoclema lineatum
 †Acanthoclema ohioensis
 †Acanthoclema sulcatum
 †Acanthonema
 †Acanthonema holopiforme
 †Acanthonema newberryi
 †Acanthopecten
 †Acanthopecten bellosum – type locality for species
 †Acanthopecten carboniferus
 †Acanthotriletes
 †Acanthotriletes aculeolatus
 †Achatella
 †Acidaspis
 †Acidaspis cincinnatiensis
 †Acleistoceras – tentative report
 †Acmaeoblatta – type locality for genus
 †Acmaeoblatta lanceolata – type locality for species
 †Acriora
 †Acriora petala
 †Acteonina
 †Acteonina hanseni – type locality for species
 †Actinodesma
 †Actinodesma erectum
 †Actinopteria
 †Actinopteria boydi
 †Acutichiton – type locality for genus
 †Acutichiton pyrmidalus – type locality for species
 †Adamanterpeton – type locality for genus
 †Adamanterpeton ohioensis – type locality for species
 †Aechmina
 †Aechmina richmondensis
 †Aethaspis
 †Agelacrinites
 †Agelacrinites southworthi – or unidentified comparable form
 †Agnesia
 †Agnesia prosseri
 †Alaionema
 †Alaionema crenulatum
 †Alaskozygopleura
 †Alaskozygopleura gracillium
 †Alatisporites
 †Alatisporites trialatus
  †Alethopteris
 †Allocryptaspis
 †Alloiopteris
 †Alloiopteris erosa
 †Allonema
 †Allonychia
 †Allorisma
 †Allorisma costatum
 †Alveolites
 †Alveolites labechii
 †Ambedus – type locality for genus
 †Ambedus pusilus – type locality for species
 †Ambocoelia
 †Ambocoelia norwoodi
 †Ambocoelia umbonata
 †Ambonychia
 †Ambonychia alata
 †Ambonychia cultrata
 †Ambonychia richmondensis
 †Ambonychia suberecta
 †Ambozone
 †Ambozone peoriensis – or unidentified comparable form
 †Ametroblatta
 †Ametroblatta strigosa – type locality for species
 †Ameura
 †Ameura missouriensis
 †Ammonidium
 †Ammonidium hamatum
 †Amphilichas
 †Amphiscapha
 †Amphiscapha catilloides
 †Amphiscapha reedsi
  †Amplexopora
 †Amplexopora pustulosa
 †Amplexopora robusta
 †Anaptychus – tentative report
 †Anaptychus emersoni
 †Anartiocystis
 †Anartiocystis foerstei
 †Anaspyroceras
 †Ancienta
 †Ancienta ohioensis
   †Annularia
 †Annularia asteris
 †Annularia radiata
 †Annularia sphenophylloides
 †Annularia stellata
 †Anomalocrinus
 †Anomalodonta
 †Anomalodonta costata
 †Anomalotoechus
 †Anomalotoechus tuberatus
 †Anostylostroma
 †Anostylostroma columnare
 †Anostylostroma laxum
 †Anozyga – type locality for genus
 †Anozyga bulla – type locality for species
 †Anthracodromeus
 †Anthracodromeus longipes – type locality for species
 †Anthracopupa – type locality for genus
 †Anthracopupa ohioensis – type locality for species
   †Anthracosaurus
 †Anthracosaurus lancifer – type locality for species
 †Antiquaster
 †Antiquaster magrumi
 †Antiquatonia
 †Antiquatonia costata
 †Antiquatonia portlockianus
 †Aparchites
 †Aparchites minutissimus
 †Aparchites oblongus
 †Aphelakardia
 †Aphelakardia alternistriata
 †Aphlebia
 †Apiculatasporites
 †Apiculatasporites acueatus
 †Apiculatasporites latigranifer
 †Apiculatasporites saetiger
 †Apiculatasporites setulosus
 †Arabellites
    †Archaeothyris
 †Archegogryllus – type locality for genus
 †Archegogryllus priscus – type locality for species
 †Archinacella
 †Archinacella rugatina
 †Arcochiton – type locality for genus
 †Arcochiton raymondi – type locality for species
  †Arctinurus
 †Arjamannia
 †Arjamannia inexpectans
 †Armenoceras
 †Arthraria
 †Arthraria biclavata
 †Arthroacantha
 †Arthroacantha carpenteri
 †Arthropitys
 Arthropoma
 †Arthropoma shafferi
 †Arthrostylus
 †Artisia
 †Ascodictyon
 †Ascodictyon fusiforme
 †Asolanus
 †Asolanus camptotaenia
 †Asolanus sigillarioides
 †Aspidopora
 †Aspidopora newberryi
 †Astartella
 †Astartella clinata – type locality for species
 †Astartella concentrica
 †Astartella varica
 †Astartella vera
 †Asterotheca
 †Atactoblatta – type locality for genus
 †Atactoblatta anomala – type locality for species
 †Atactoechus
 †Atactoechus typicus – or unidentified comparable form
 †Atactopora
 †Atactoporella
 †Ateleocystites
 †Athyris
 †Athyris vittata
 †Atraktoprion
 †Atrypa
  †Atrypa reticularis
 †Atrypa reticularus – report made of unidentified related form or using admittedly obsolete nomenclature
 †Augustoceras
 †Aulacella
 †Aulacera
 †Aulacera nodulosa
 †Aulocystis
 †Aulocystis auloporoidea
 †Aulocystis auloporoides
 †Aulocystis flabellata
 †Aulocystis jacksoni
 †Aulocystis lucasensis
  †Aulopora
 †Aulopora microbuccinata
 †Aulopora serpens
 †Austinella
 †Austinella scovellei
  †Aviculopecten
 †Aviculopecten appalachianus – type locality for species
 †Aviculopecten columbianus – type locality for species
 †Aviculopecten coxanus
 †Aviculopecten fasciculatus
 †Aviculopecten occidentalis
 †Aviculopecten princeps
 †Aviculopecten winchelli
 †Aviculopinna
 †Aviculopinna peracuta

B

 †Bactrites – tentative report
 †Bactrites arkonensis – or unidentified comparable form
 Bairdia
 †Bairdia devonica
 †Balbiniconcha
 †Balbiniconcha hebe
 †Baldwinonus
 †Baldwinonus dunkardensis
 †Barathrisphaeridium
 †Barathrisphaeridium chagrinense
 †Barathrisphaeridium pumilispinosum
 †Barbclabornia
 †Barbclabornia luedersensis
 †Barychilina
 †Batostoma
 †Batostoma varians
 †Batostomella
 †Batostomella gracilis
 †Batostomella striata
 †Baylea
 †Baylea giffordi – or unidentified comparable form
 †Baylea inclinata – type locality for species
 †Beatricea
 †Beatricea undulata
  †Bellerophon
 †Bellerophon hyalina
 †Bellerophon jeffersonensis
 †Bellerophon newberryi
 †Bellerophon pelops
 †Bellerophon spergensis
 †Bellerophon stevensianus
 †Bellerophon stummi – type locality for species
 †Bellerophon whittleseyi – type locality for species
 †Belodella
 †Beloitoceras
 †Beloitoceras amoenum
 †Bembexia
 †Bembexia adjutor – type locality for species
 †Bembexia insolita
 Berenicea
 †Bethanyphyllum
 †Bethanyphyllum robustum
 †Bicarina
 †Bicarina petilitornata
 †Bickmorites
 †Bikocrinus
 †Bikocrinus baios
 †Billingsastraea
 †Billingsastraea longicarinata
 †Billingsastrea
 †Billingsastrea longicarinata
 †Blattinopsis
 †Blattinopsis americana – type locality for species
 †Blattinopsis anthracina – type locality for species
 †Blattinopsis latipennis – type locality for species
 †Bodmania
 †Bollia
 †Bollia persulcata
 †Bollia regularis
 †Botryllopora
 †Botryllopora socialis
 †Botryocrinus
 †Botryocrinus neimani
 †Bowmanites
 †Bowmanites incurvata
 †Bowmanites magna
 †Brachiospongia
    †Brachydectes – type locality for genus
 †Brachydectes newberryi – type locality for species
 †Brockocystis
 †Brockocystis nodosaria
  †Broiliellus
 †Broiliellus hektotopos – type locality for species
 †Bucanella
 †Bucania
 †Bucania crassa
 †Bucanopsis
 †Buthotrephis
 †Buthotrephis gracilis
 †Byssonychia
 †Byssonychia grandis
 †Byssonychia radiata
 Bythocypris
 †Bythocypris cylindrica
 †Bythocypris punctatus
 †Bythopora
 †Bythopora delicatula
 †Bythopora striata

C

   †Calamites
 †Calamites carinatus
 †Calamites cisti
 †Calamites citiifromis
 †Calamites sachsi
 †Calamites schützeiformis
 †Calamites suckowi
 †Calamites suckowii
 †Calamites undulatus
 †Calamospora
 †Calamospora breviradiata
 †Calamospora hartungiana
 †Calamospora straminea
 †Calamostachys
 †Calamostachys bisporangiata – type locality for species
 †Calamostachys germanica
 †Calamostachys interculata – type locality for species
 †Calamostachys longibracteata – type locality for species
 †Calamostachys minuta – type locality for species
 †Calamostachys recurvata – type locality for species
 †Calamostachys tuberculata
 †Calapoecia
 †Calceocrinus
 †Calceocrinus incertus
 †Callipleura
 †Callipleura nobilis – or unidentified comparable form
  †Callixylon
 †Callixylon clevelandensis
 †Callixylon newberryi
 †Calloporella
 †Calostylis – tentative report
 †Calostylis lindstroemi
 †Calvibembexia
 †Calvibembexia sulcomarginata
 †Camarotoechia
 †Camarotoechia semiplicata
   †Cameroceras
 †Cardiocarpon
 †Cardiomorpha
 †Cardiomorpha missouriensis
 †Carneyella
 †Carneyella foerstei
 †Caryocrinites
 †Catazone
 †Catazone eversolensis – type locality for species
 †Catazyga
 †Catazyga headi
  †Catenipora
 †Catenipora favositomima
 †Catenipora favositomina
 †Catenipora gotlandica
 †Caulopteris
 †Caulopteris antiqua
 †Caulopteris peregrina
 †Cayugaea
 †Cayugaea intermittens
 †Cayugaea transitorius – tentative report
 †Centroceras
 †Centrorhynchus (= Sartenaerus)
 †Ceramoporella
 †Ceramoporella granulosa
 †Ceramoporella ohioensis
 †Ceratocephala
 †Ceratoikiscum
 †Ceratoikiscum bujugum
 †Ceratoikiscum spinosiarcuatum
 †Ceratoikiscump
 †Ceratoikiscump erittacanthinum
 †Ceratoikiscump lanistellare
 †Ceratopsis
 †Ceratopsis chambersi
 †Ceratopsis oculifera
 †Ceraurinus
 †Ceraurinus icarus
  †Ceraurus
 †Chaenomya
 †Chaenomya leavenworthensis
 †Chagrinia
 †Chagrinichnites
 †Charactoceras
 †Chasmatopora
  †Chasmops
 †Chaunograptus
 †Chiloporella
 †Chlidochirus
 †Chlidochirus springeri
   †Chondrites
 †Chonetes
 †Chonetes aurora – tentative report
 †Chonetes deflectus
 †Chonetes minutus
 †Chonetes mucronatus – tentative report
 †Chonetina
 †Chonetina choteauensis
 †Chonetinella
 †Chonetinella flemingi
 †Chonetinella verneuilana
 †Chonetinella verneuiliana
 †Cincinnaticrinus
 †Cincinnatidiscus
  †Cincinnetina
 †Cincinnetina meeki
 †Cincinnetina multisecta
 †Cirratriradites
 †Cirratriradites annulatus
  †Cladochonus
 †Cladopora
 †Cladopora bifurcata
 †Cladopora crassa
 †Cladopora lucasensis
 †Cladopora minuitissima
 †Cladopora roemeri
   †Cladoselache
 †Cladoselache clarki
 †Clarkesvillia
 †Clathrodictyon
 †Clathrodictyon confertum
 †Clathrospira
 †Claudeonychia – type locality for genus
 †Claudeonychia babini – type locality for species
 †Cleionychia
 †Clemetaocrinus
 †Clemetaocrinus ohioensis
 †Clevelandodendron
 †Clevelandodendron ohioensis
  †Climacograptus
 †Clinopistha
 †Clinopistha radiata
 †Coelocaulus
 †Coelocaulus desiderata
 †Coelocaulus strebloceras – tentative report
 †Coeloclema
 †Coeloclema oweni
 †Coenites
 †Coleolus
 †Coleolus iowensis
  †Colosteus
 †Colosteus scutellatus – type locality for species
 †Columnaria
 †Columnaria calicina
 †Comasphaeridium
 †Comasphaeridium caesariatum
  †Composita
 †Composita subtilita
 †Compsocrinus
 †Compsocrinus harrisi
 †Conchidium
 †Conradidium
 †Conradidium firmamentum
  †Constellaria
 †Conularia
 †Conularia formosa
 †Convolutispora
 †Convolutispora mellita
 †Cordaianthus
  †Cordaites
 †Cordaites principalis – or unidentified comparable form
 †Cornellites
 †Cornellites flabellum
  †Cornulites
 †Cornulites flexuosus
 †Corocrinus
 †Corocrinus noduosus
 †Corynotrypa
 †Corynotrypa delicatula
 †Corynotrypa inflata
 †Corythoecia
 †Corythoecia dichoptera
 †Costatulites
 †Costatulites richmondensis
 †Cranaena
 †Cranaena romingeri
 Craniella
 †Craniella hamiltonae
 †Crassisphaeridium
 †Crassisphaeridium inusitatum
 †Crassispora
 †Crassispora kosankei
 †Crenistriella
 †Crenistriella rotalinea
 †Crenulazona
 †Crenulazona angulata
 †Crepipora
 †Crurithyris
 †Crurithyris planoconvexa
 †Cryptolithus
 †Cryptolithus tesselata
  †Ctenacanthus
 †Ctenacanthus compressus
 †Ctenerpeton
 †Ctenerpeton remex – type locality for species
 †Ctenobolbina
 †Ctenobolbina ciliata
 †Ctenobolbina duryi
 †Ctenobolbina hammeli
 †Ctenodonta
 †Ctenodonta madisonensis
 †Ctenodonta recurva
  †Ctenospondylus
 †Ctenospondylus ninevehensis
 †Cuffeyella
 †Cuffeyella arachnoidea
 †Cunctocrinus
 †Cunctocrinus fortunatus – type locality for species
 †Cuneamya
 †Cuneamya elliptica
 †Cuneamya miamiensis
 †Cuneamya scapha
 †Cupularostrum
 †Cupularostrum prolificum
 †Cupulocrinus
 †Cycloconcha
 †Cyclocystoides
 †Cyclogranisporites
 †Cyclogranisporites microgranus
 †Cyclogranisporites minutus
 †Cyclogranisporites obliquus
 †Cyclogranisporites orbicularis
 †Cyclonema
 †Cyclonema bilix
 †Cyclonema gyronemoides
 †Cyclonema humerosum
 †Cyclonema minuta
  †Cyclopteris
 †Cyclopteris orbicularis
 †Cyclopteris trichomanoides
 †Cyclora
 †Cyclora depressa
 †Cyclora hoffmani
 †Cyclora parvula
 †Cyclora pulcella
 †Cyclozyga
 †Cyclozyga attenuata – type locality for species
 †Cyclozyga mirabilis
 †Cylindrocoelia
 †Cylindrophyllum
 †Cylindrophyllum delicatulum
 †Cylindrophyllum delicatum
 †Cylindrophyllum profundum
 †Cymatiosphaera
 †Cymatiosphaera acinosa
 †Cymatiosphaera adaiochorata
 †Cymatiosphaera brevicrista
 †Cymatiosphaera daioariochora
 †Cymatiosphaera labyrinthica
 †Cymatiosphaera parvicarina
 †Cymatiosphaera rhacoamba
 †Cymatiosphaera velicarina
 †Cymatonota
 †Cymatonota constricta
 †Cymatonota cylindrica
 †Cymatonota parallela
 †Cymatonota recta
 †Cymatonota semistriata
 †Cymatospira
 †Cymatospira alternodosa – type locality for species
 †Cymatospira montfortianus
 †Cyperites
 †Cyphotrypa
 †Cyphotrypa clarksvillensis
 †Cypricardinia
 †Cypricardinia indenta
 Cypridina
 †Cypridina herzeri
 †Cyrtentactinia
 †Cyrtentactinia cibdelosphaera
 †Cyrtentactinia primotica
 †Cyrtina
 †Cyrtina alpenensis
 †Cyrtina hamiltonensis
 †Cyrtina umbonata
 †Cyrtocerina
 †Cyrtodonta
 †Cyrtodonta halli
 †Cyrtodontula
 †Cyrtolites
 †Cyrtolites claysferryensis
 †Cyrtolites inornatum
 †Cyrtolites ornatus
 †Cyrtolites retrorsus
 †Cyrtospira
 †Cyrtospira directus
  †Cyrtospirifer
 †Cystaster
 †Cystiphylloides
 †Cystiphylloides americanum
 †Cystodictya
 †Cystodictya hamiltonensis
 †Cystodictya incisurata
 Cythere
 †Cythere ohioensis
 Cytherella
 †Cytherella unioniformis

D

 †Dalmanella
 †Danaeites
 †Danaeites emersonii
  †Decadocrinus
 †Decadocrinus hughwingi
 †Decadocrinus stewartae
 †Decadocrinus wrightae
 †Deceptrix
 †Deceptrix albertina
 †Dechenella
 †Dechenella alpenensis
 †Dechenella lucasensis
 †Dekayella
 †Dekayia
 †Deltodus
 †Deltoidospora
 †Deltoidospora levis
 †Deltoidospora priddyi
 †Denayella
 †Denayella rotalia
 †Dendrocrinus
 †Dendrocrinus daytonensis
 †Derbyia
 †Derbyia crassa
 †Dermatostroma
 †Dermatostroma scabrum
 †Desmoinesia
 †Desmoinesia muricatina
 †Devonalosia
 †Devonalosia wrightorum
 †Devonochonetes
 †Devonochonetes coronatus
 †Devonochonetes fragilis
 †Devonochonetes scitulus
 †Devonorhineoderma
 †Devonorhineoderma hyphantes
 †Diaphorochroa
 †Diaphorochroa ganglia
 †Dicalamophyllum
  †Diceratosaurus
 †Diceratosaurus brevirostris – type locality for species
 †Dicranopora
 †Dicranopora emacerata
 †Dictyoclostus
 †Dictyoclostus semireticulatus
 †Dictyonema
 †Dictyotomaria
 †Dictyotomaria capillaria
 †Dictyotomaria scitula – or unidentified comparable form
 †Diestoceras
 †Diestoceras eos
 †Diestoceras indianense
 †Diestoceras shideleri
 †Diexallophasis
 †Diexallophasis absona
 †Diexallophasis cuspidis
  †Dinichthys
 †Dinichthys herzeri
 †Dinophyllum
 †Dinophyllum semilunum
 †Dinophyllum stokesi
 †Dinorthis
 †Dinorthis carleyi
 †Diphyphyllum
  †Diploceraspis
  †Diplograptus
 †Diplograptus recurrens
 Discina
 †Discotrypa
 †Dithyrocaris
 †Dithyrocaris neptuni – or unidentified comparable form
 †Ditomopyge
 †Ditomopyge decurtata
 †Ditomopyge scitula
 †Divietipellis
 †Divietipellis robusta
  †Dolichopterus
 †Dolichopterus asperatus
 †Donaldiella
 †Donaldina
 †Donaldina bellilineata – or unidentified comparable form
 †Donaldina pygmaea – tentative report
 †Donaldina robusta – type locality for species
 †Donaldina stevensana – type locality for species
 †Dorsennidium
 †Dorsennidium patulum
 †Doryblatta – type locality for genus
 †Doryblatta longipennis – type locality for species
 †Douvillina
 †Douvillina distans
 †Drepanella
 †Drepanella richardsoni
 †Drepanoistodus
 †Drymocrinus
 †Drymocrinus geniculatus
 †Dunbarella
 †Dunbarella knighti – or unidentified comparable form
 †Dunbarella striata
   †Dunkleosteus
 †Dunkleosteus raveri – type locality for species
 †Dvorakia
 †Dystactocrinus
 †Dystactocrinus constrictus
 †Dystactospongia

E

 †Ecclimadictyon
 †Ecdyceras
 †Ecdyceras foerstei
 †Echinocaris
 †Echinocaris multinodosa
 †Echinocaris multispinosis
 †Echinocaris ohioensis – type locality for species
 †Echinocaris pulchra – type locality for species
 †Echinocaris punctata
 †Echinocaris sublevis
 †Echinocoelia
 †Echinoconchus
 †Echinoconchus punctatus
 †Echinolichas
 †Echinolichas lucasensis
 †Ecmelostoiba
 †Ecmelostoiba asymmetrica
 †Ecmelostoiba leptoderma
 †Economolopsis
 †Economolopsis anodontoides
 †Ectenocrinus
 †Ectenocrinus simplex
 †Ecthymabrachion
 †Ecthymabrachion camptos
 †Edmondia
 †Edmondia aspenwallensis
 †Edmondia aspinwallensis
 †Edmondia nebrascensis
 †Edmondia nodulifera – type locality for species
 †Edon
 †Edon oblonga
 †Elasmonema
 †Elasmonema bellatula
 †Elasmonema clarki
 †Elasmonema corrugata – type locality for species
 †Elasmonema imitator
 †Elasmonema lichas
  †Eldredgeops
 †Eldredgeops rana
 †Elegantilites – tentative report
 †Elektoriskos
 †Elektoriskos apodasmios
 †Elektoriskos arcetotricus
 †Elektoriskos lasios
 †Eliasopora
 †Eliasopora stellatum
 †Elita
 †Elpe
 †Elpe cincinnatiensis
 †Elpe irregularis
 †Elpe ulrichi
 †Elrodoceras
 †Emmonsia
 †Emmonsia arbuscula
 †Emmonsia radiciformis
 †Endelocrinus
 †Endelocrinus kieri – type locality for species
  †Endoceras
 †Endosporites
 †Endosporites globiformis
 †Endosporites plicatus
 †Endosporites zonalis
 †Endothyra
 †Endothyra kennethi
 †Endothyranella
 †Endothyranella inflata
 †Endothyranella intermissa
 †Endothyranella minuta – or unidentified comparable form
 †Endothyranella nitida – or unidentified comparable form
 †Endothyranella stormi – or unidentified comparable form
 †Entactinia
 †Entactinia additiva
 †Entactinia cometes
 †Entactinia crustescens
 †Entactinia exilispina
 †Entactinia herculea
 †Entactinia micula
 †Entactinia monalloea
 †Entactinia pantosompha
 †Entactinia paula
 †Entactinia quantilla
 †Entactinia somphorhips
 †Entactinia spongites
 †Entactinia sychnacanthina
 †Entactinosphaera
 †Entactinosphaera diplostraca
 †Entactinosphaera dystactotata
 †Entactinosphaera echinata – tentative report
 †Entactinosphaera erebenna
 †Entactinosphaera esostrongyla
 †Entactinosphaera euthlasta
 †Entactinosphaera fredericki
 †Entactinosphaera hapala
 †Entactinosphaera hystricosa
 †Entactinosphaera inusitata
 †Entactinosphaera polyacanthina
 †Entactinosphaera riedeli
 †Entactinosphaera symphypora
 †Entactinosphaera tretactinia
 †Entactinosphaera variacanthina
 †Entactinosphaerap
 †Entactinosphaerap alimbola
 †Enteletes
 †Enteletes hemiplicata
 †Eochonetes
 †Eochonetes clarksvillensis
 †Eochonetes clarkvillensis
 †Eomarginifera
 †Eomarginifera longispinus
 †Eomyelodactylus
 †Eomyelodactylus rotundatus
 †Eomylodactylus
 †Eomylodactylus rotundatus
 †Eotrophina
 †Ephelopalla
 †Ephelopalla elongata
 †Ephelopalla talea
  †Erettopterus
 †Erettopterus saetiger
 †Eridoconcha
 †Eridoconcha rugosa
 †Eridorthis
 †Eridotrypa
 †Erisocrinus
 †Erisocrinus typus
 †Erpetosaurus
 †Erpetosaurus radiatus – type locality for species
 †Escharopora
 †Estiastra
 †Estiastra culcita
 †Estiastra dilatostella
 †Estiastra rugosa
  †Eucalyptocrinites
 †Euchondria
 †Euchondria neglecta
 †Euchondria ohioensis – type locality for species
 †Euchondria pellucida
 †Euconospira
 †Euconospira turbiniformis
 †Eunicites
  †Euomphalus
 †Euomphalus planodorsatus
 †Euomphalus similis
 †Euphemites
 †Euphemites carbonarius
 †Euphemites enodis – type locality for species
 †Euphemites multiliratus – type locality for species
 †Euphemites nodocarinatus
 †Euphemites subglobosus
 †Euphemites vittatus
 †Eurymya
 †Euryocrinus – tentative report
 †Euryocrinus laddii
  †Eurypterus
 †Eurypterus ornatus
 †Eusauropleura – type locality for genus
 †Eusauropleura digitata – type locality for species
 †Eutaxocrinus
 †Eutaxocrinus wideneri
 †Evenkiella
 †Exilisphaeridium
 †Exilisphaeridium simplex
 †Exochoderma
 †Exochoderma irregulare
 †Exochoderma ramibrachium

F

 †Faberia
 †Faberia anomala
 †Faberoceras
 †Favistella
  †Favosites
 †Favosites dentistabulatus
 †Favosites discoideus
 †Favosites favosus
 †Favosites hamiltonae
 †Favosites hamiltoniae
 †Favosites hisingeri
 †Favosites turbinatus
 †Fayettoceras
 †Fenestella
 †Fenestella shumardi
 †Fenestrellina
 †Fenestrellina rockportensis
 †Fistulipora
 †Fistulipora vesiculata
  †Flexicalymene
 †Flexicalymene meeki
 †Florinites
 †Florinites florini
 †Florinites mediapudens
 †Florinites milloti
 †Florinites similis
 †Florinites visendus
 †Foerstia
 †Foerstia ohioensis
 †Fusispira
  †Fusulina
 †Fusulina secalica
0 Links

G

 †Gamizyga
 †Gamizyga corpulentissima
 †Gamizyga girtyi – type locality for species
 †Gamizyga morningstarae
 †Gerablattina
 †Gerablattina richmondiana – type locality for species
 †Gigantopteris – or unidentified comparable form
  †Gilbertsocrinus
 †Gilbertsocrinus alpenensis
 †Gilbertsocrinus ohioensis
 †Gillespieisporites
 †Gillespieisporites venustus
 †Girtyspira
 †Girtyspira minuta
 †Glabrocingulum
 †Glabrocingulum beedei – type locality for species
 †Glabrocingulum grayvillense
 †Glabrocingulum stellaeformis
 †Glabrocingulum wannense – or unidentified comparable form
 †Globodoma
 †Globodoma nodosa
 †Globozyga
 †Globozyga reticulata
 †Globozyga subcorpulenta – type locality for species
 †Glossites
 †Glossites subtenuis
 †Glyptocardia
 †Glyptocardia speciosa
  †Glyptocrinus
 †Glyptocrinus richardsoni
 †Glyptorthis
 †Glyptorthis daytonensis – type locality for species
 †Glyptorthis fausta – type locality for species
 †Glyptorthis insculpta
 †Gomphostrobus
 †Goniasma
 †Goniasma lasallense – or unidentified comparable form
 †Gonioloboceras
 †Gorbyoceras
 †Gorogonisphaeridium
 †Gorogonisphaeridium absitum
 †Gorogonisphaeridium elongatum
 †Gorogonisphaeridium evexispinosum
 †Gorogonisphaeridium ohioense
 †Gorogonisphaeridium plerispinosum
 †Gorogonisphaeridium separatum
 †Gosseletia
 †Gosseletia triquetra
 †Gosselettia
 †Gosselettia triquetra
 †Graciloceras
 †Grammysia
 †Grammysia arcuata
 †Grammysia bellatula
 †Grammysia bisulcata
 †Grammysia constricta
 †Grammysia nodocostata
 †Grammysia sylvanensis
 †Grammysioidea
 †Granasporites
 †Granasporites medius
 †Granulatisporites
 †Granulatisporites granulatus
 †Granulatisporites minutus
 †Granulatisporites parvus
 †Granulatisporites piroformis
 †Graptodictya
 †Graptodictya perelegans
  †Grewingkia
 †Grewingkia rusticum
 †Guttatisphaeridium
 †Guttatisphaeridium pandum
 †Gypidula

H

 †Habrostroma
 †Habrostroma beachvillensis
 †Habrostroma larocquei
 †Habrostroma marpleae
 †Hallinetes
 †Hallinetes setigera
  †Hallopora
 †Hallopora bassleri
 †Hallopora flabellaris
 †Hallopora libana
 †Hallopora nicklesi
 †Hallopora subnodosa
  †Halysites
 †Halysites catenularis
 †Halysites catenularius
 †Halysites nitidus
 †Hamiltonella
 †Hamiltonella punctulifera
 †Haplentactinia
 †Haplentactinia arrhinia
 †Haplentactinia rhinophyusa
 †Hawletrochus
 †Hawletrochus macrostomus
 †Hebertella
 †Hebertella alveata
 †Hebertella occidentalis
 †Hebertella sinuata
 †Hebertella subjugata
 †Hebertocaris
 †Hebertocaris wideneri
 †Hederella
 †Hederella alpenensis
 †Hederella bilineata
 †Hederella cirrhosa
 †Hederella concinnoides
 †Hederella delicatula
 †Hederella filiformis
 †Hederella magna
 †Hederella parvirugosa
 †Hederella rectifurcata
 †Hederella reimanni
 †Hederella thedfordensis
 †Hederella vagans
  †Helcionopsis
 †Helicelasma
 †Helicelasma rusticum
 †Helicotoma
 †Heliolites
  †Heliophyllum
 †Heliophyllum bathycalyx
 †Heliophyllum halli
 †Heliophyllum microcarinatum
 †Helminthochiton
 †Helminthochiton simplex
 †Helminthozyga
 †Helminthozyga costellata – type locality for species
 †Helminthozyga undulata – type locality for species
 †Helopora
 †Helopora inexpectata
 †Hemicystites
 †Hemiphragma
 †Hemizyga
 †Hemizyga attenuata
 †Hemizyga elegans – or unidentified comparable form
 †Hemizyga illineata – or unidentified comparable form
 †Heracloceras – tentative report
 †Heracloceras inelegans – tentative report
 †Hercostrophia
 †Hercostrophia robusta
 †Heslerodus
 †Heslerodus divergens
 †Hessonia
 †Hessonia priscus
 †Heterocrinus
 †Heterocrinus exiguus
 †Heterocrinus exilis
 †Heterocrinus heterodactylus
 †Heterocrinus juvenis
 †Heterocrinus pentagonus
 †Heteronema – tentative report
 †Heterophrentis
 †Heterophrentis simplex
 †Heterorthina
 †Heterorthina fairmountensis
 †Heterotrypa
  †Hexagonaria
 †Hexagonaria anna
 †Hexagonaria stewartae
 †Hexagonaria tabulata
 †Hexagonaria truncata
 †Hexameroceras
 †Hindella
 †Hindia
 †Hippocardia
 †Hippocardia herricki – type locality for species
 †Hippocardia hydei – type locality for species
 †Hippocardia monroica
 †Hippocardia ohioense
 †Hiscobeccus
 †Hiscobeccus capax
 †Hoareicardia
 †Hoareicardia cunea
 †Holoeciscus
 †Holoeciscus auceps
  †Holopea
 †Holoptychus – or unidentified comparable form
 †Holtedahlina
 †Holtedahlina sulcata
 †Homotrypa
 †Homotrypa wortheni
 †Homotrypella
 †Homotrypella dubia
 †Hormotoma
 †Hormotoma centervillensis – type locality for species
 †Hormotomina
 †Hormotomina maia
 †Hudsonaster
 †Hudsonaster incomptus
 †Hustedia
 †Hustedia mormoni
 †Hyattidina
   †Hyolithes
 †Hyolithes dubius
 †Hyolithes parviusculus
 †Hyolithes versaillensis
 †Hypergonia
 †Hypergonia jonathanensis – type locality for species
 †Hyperoblastus
 †Hyperoblastus reimanni
 †Hyphantozyga
 †Hyphantozyga cancellata – type locality for species
 †Hyphantozyga fusiforma – type locality for species
 †Hyphantozyga gracilis
 †Hyphantozyga grandis – type locality for species
 †Hyphantozyga knighti
 †Hyphantozyga perattenuata
 †Hyphantozyga pulchra
 †Hyphantozyga textilis – type locality for species
 †Hypselentoma
 †Hypselentoma inornata
 †Hystriculina
 †Hystriculina wabashensis

I

 †Ianthinopsis
 †Ianthinopsis melanoides – type locality for species
 †Ibanocrinus
 †Ibanocrinus petalos
 †Ichthyerpeton
 †Ichthyerpeton squamosum – type locality for species
 †Icriodus
 †Icriodus angustus
 †Icriodus arkonensis
 †Icriodus brevis
 †Icriodus eriensis
 †Icriodus excavatus
 †Icriodus expansus
 †Icriodus janeae
 †Icriodus lindensis
 †Icriodus obliquimarginatus
 †Icriodus ohioensis
 †Icriodus platyobliquimarginatus
 †Icriodus regularicrescens
 †Indospora
 †Indospora stewartii
 †Intrapora
 †Intrapora irregularis
  †Iocrinus
 †Ischyrodonta
 †Ischyrodonta truncata
 †Ischyrodonta unionoides
  †Isodectes
 †Isodectes obtusus – type locality for species
 †Isonema
 †Isonema depressum
 †Isorophus
 †Isorophus austini
 †Isorophus holbrooki
 †Isorophus warrenensis
 †Isorthoceras
 †Isorthoceras albersi
  †Isotelus
 †Isotelus maximus
 †Isotelus megistos

J

 †Jedria
 †Jedria ventrica
 †Jonesella
 †Jonesella crepidiformis
 †Jonesella pedigera
 †Jonesites
 †Jonesites inornatus
 †Jonesites marginatus
 †Jugiaster
 †Jugiaster speciosus
 †Juresania
 †Juresania ovalis

K

 †Kindleoceras
  †Kionoceras
 †Kockelella
 †Kockelella ortus
 †Kockelella ranuliformis
 †Kockelella walliseri
 †Kophinocrinus – tentative report
 †Kophinocrinus magrumi – tentative report
 †Kyreocrinus
 †Kyreocrinus constellatus

L

 †Labechia
 †Laccoprimitia
 †Laccoprimitia centralis
 †Laevigatosporites
 †Laevigatosporites desmoinesensis
 †Laevigatosporites globosus
 †Laevigatosporites medius
 †Laevigatosporites minimus
 †Laevigatosporites minor
 †Laevigatosporites ovalis
 †Laevigatosporites subadnatoides
 †Laevigatosporites vulgaris
 †Lambeoceras
 †Lanthanaster
 †Lanthanaster cruciformis – type locality for species
 †Lasiograptus
 †Latericriodus
 †Latericriodus latericrescens
 †Latosporites
 †Latosporites minutus
 †Lechritrochoceras
 †Leioclema
 †Leioclema alpenense
 †Leioclema alpense
 †Leiorhynchus
 †Leiorhynchus kelloggi
 †Leiorhynchus laura
 †Leiorhynchus lucasi
 †Leiosphaeridia
 †Leiotriletes
 †Leiotriletes granoornatus
 †Leiotriletes levis
 †Leiotriletes microsaetosus
 †Leiotriletes pseudaculeatus
 †Leiotriletes subadnatoides
 †Lepadocystis
 †Leperditia
 †Leperditia glabra
 †Lepidocoleus
 †Lepidocyclus
 †Lepidocyclus perlamellosum
 †Lepidocystis
    †Lepidodendron
 †Lepidodendron aculeatum
 †Lepidodendron andrewsi
 †Lepidodendron jaraczewskii – or unidentified comparable form
 †Lepidodendron scutatum
 †Lepidolites
 †Lepidophloios
 †Lepidophloios larcinus
 †Lepidophloios vaningeni
 †Lepidostrobophyllum
 †Leptaena
 †Leptaena gibbosa
 †Leptaena richmondensis
 †Leptobolus
 †Leptobolus insignis
 †Leptodesma
 †Leptodesma ausablensis
 †Leptodesma matheri – or unidentified comparable form
 †Leptodesma rhysema – type locality for species
 †Leptograptus
 †Leptophractus – type locality for genus
 †Leptophractus obsoletus – type locality for species
 †Leptopoterion
 †Leptoptygma
 †Leptoptygma newtonensis – type locality for species
 †Leptotrypa
 †Leptotrypella
 †Leptotrypella ohioensis
 †Lescuropteris
 †Lescuropteris moorii
 †Levizygopleura
 †Levizygopleura inornata
 †Levizygopleura williamsi
 †Lichenocrinus
 †Lichenocrinus tuberculata
 †Limipecten
 †Limipecten lamellus – type locality for species
 †Limoptera
 †Limoptera curvata
 †Limoptera macroptera
 Lingula
 †Lingula carbonaria
 †Lingula meeki
 †Lingula melie
 †Lingulichnus
 †Lingulops
 †Linoproductus
 †Linoproductus cora
 †Linoproductus prattenianus
 †Linopteris
 †Linopteris muensteri
 †Linopteris neuropteroides
 †Lioclemella
 †Liospira
 †Liospira affinis
 †Liospira depressum – type locality for species
 †Liroceras – tentative report
 †Lodanaria
 †Lodanaria quadricarinata – type locality for species
 †Logocrinus – tentative report
 †Logocrinus brandoni – tentative report
 †Longispina
 †Longispina lissohybus
 †Longstaffia – tentative report
 †Longstaffia centervillensis – type locality for species
 †Lopholasma
 †Lopholasma delawarensis
 †Lophonychia
 †Lophonychia cordata
 †Lophophyllidium
 †Lophophyllidium profundum
 †Lophospira
 †Lophospira milleri
 †Lophospira perangulata
 †Lophotriletes
 †Lophotriletes granoornatus
   †Loxomma
 †Loxomma lintonensis – type locality for species
 †Loxonema
 †Loxonema pikensis
 †Loxoplocus
 †Loxoplocus gothlandicus – type locality for species
 †Lycospora
 †Lycospora granulata
 †Lycospora micropapillata
 †Lycospora orbicula
 †Lycospora pellucida
 †Lycospora pusilla
 †Lycospora subjuga
 †Lycospora torquifer
 †Lyopora
 †Lyopora goldfussi
 †Lyriopecten
 †Lyriopecten mitchelli
 †Lyrodesma
 †Lyrodesma major

M

 †Macrerpeton
 †Macrerpeton huxleyi – type locality for species
 †Macrochilina
 †Macrochilina humilis
 †Maelonoceras
 †Manitoulinoceras
 †Manitoulinoceras gyroforme
 †Manitoulinoceras williamsae
  †Manticoceras
 †Manticrinus
 †Manticrinus exaitos
 †Marsupiocrinus
 †Maryonychia
 †Maryonychia concordensis
 †Mastigograptus
 †Mastigograptus strictus
 †Mazostachys
 †Mazostachys compacta – type locality for species
 †Mediospirifer
 †Mediospirifer audaculus
 †Meekopinna
 †Meekopinna americana
 †Meekospira
 †Meekospira peracuta
 †Megacanthopora
 †Megacanthopora fallacis – or unidentified comparable form
 †Megacystites
  †Megalocephalus – type locality for genus
 †Megalocephalus lineolatus – type locality for species
   †Megalograptus
 †Megastrophia
 †Megastrophia concava
 †Megistocrinus
 †Megistocrinus depressus
 †Melocrinus
 †Melocrinus clarkei
 †Meristospira
 †Meristospira michiganensis
 †Merocrinus
 †Mesocoelia
 †Mesocoelia obstipisutura
 †Mesopalaeaster
 †Mesopalaeaster finei
 †Mesopalaeaster wilberanus
 †Mesothyra
 †Mesotrypa
 †Mesotrypa orbiculata
 †Metaxys
 †Metaxys fossa – type locality for species
 †Miamoceras
 †Michelinoceras
 †Micrhystridium
 †Micrhystridium adductum
 †Micrhystridium complurispinosum
 †Micrhystridium erugatum
 †Micrhystridium flexibile
 †Micrhystridium inusitatum
 †Micrhystridium profusam
 †Microceras
 †Microdoma
 †Microdoma tricarinatus
 †Microptychis
 †Microptychis cerithiformis
 †Microptychis expetendus
 †Microptychis occabus – type locality for species
 †Microptychis turbineus
 †Microreticulatisporites
 †Microreticulatisporites harrisonii
 †Microreticulatisporites nobilis
 †Microreticulatisporites sulcatus
 †Milleratia
 †Mitrospermum
 †Mitrospermum vinculum
 †Mixoneura
 †Modiolodon
 †Modiolodon subovalis
 †Modiolopsis
 †Modiolopsis capax
 †Modiolopsis modiolaris
 †Modiolopsis versaillesensis
 Modiolus
 †Modiolus fountainensis
 †Modiolus radiatus – type locality for species
 †Modiolus waverliensis
 †Modiomorpha
 †Modiomorpha concentrica
 †Modiomorpha concentricum
 †Modiomorpha mytiloides
 †Modiomorpha subalata
 †Modiomorpha subalta
 †Molgophis – type locality for genus
 †Molgophis macrurus – type locality for species
 †Monotrypa
 †Monticulipora
 †Mourlonia
 †Mourlonia plena
 †Mourlonia textus
  †Mucrospirifer
 †Mucrospirifer alpenensis
 †Mucrospirifer grabaui – or unidentified comparable form
 †Mucrospirifer mucronatus
 †Mucrospirifer prolificus
 †Multiplicisphaeridium
 †Multiplicisphaeridium anastomosis
 †Multiplicisphaeridium verrucarum
 †Muraticavea
 †Muraticavea enteichia
 †Murchisonia
 †Murchisonia anderdoniae
 †Murchisonia dublinensis – type locality for species
 †Murchisonia gracilicrista
 †Murchisonia intermedia – type locality for species
 †Murchisonia leda
 †Murchisonia minuta
 †Murchisonia sibleyensis
 †Murchisonia subcarinata
 †Murchisonia subulata
 †Myalina
 †Myalina pernaformis
 †Myelodactylus – or unidentified comparable form
 †Mytilarca
 †Mytilarca cordata

N

 †Naevisphaeridium
 †Naevisphaeridium plenilunium
 †Narthecoceras
 †Narthecoceras dunni – type locality for species
  †Naticopsis
 †Naticopsis aequistriata – type locality for species
 †Naticopsis comperta
 †Naticopsis genevievensis
 †Naticopsis levis
 †Naticopsis ziczac – type locality for species
 †Navifusa
 †Navifusa drosera
 †Neilsonia
 †Neilsonia uninodocarinata
 †Neochonetes
 †Neochonetes granulifer
 †Neochonetes variolata
  †Neospirifer
 †Neospirifer cameratus
 †Neospirifer dunbari
 †Nephriticeras – tentative report
 †Nereidavus
 †Nereidavus varians
 †Neumatoceras
  †Neuropteris
 †Neuropteris heterophylla
 †Neuropteris ovata
 †Neuropteris scheuchzeri
 †Nicholsonella
 †Nicholsonella peculiaris
 †Nicollidina
 †Nicollidina remscheidensis
 †Nodonema
 †Nodonema granulatum
 †Nucleocrinus
 †Nucleocrinus elegans – or unidentified comparable form
  Nucula
 †Nucula corbuliformis
 Nuculana
 †Nucularca
 †Nucularca cingulata
 †Nuculites
 †Nuculites faberi
 †Nuculites fabula
 †Nuculites oblongatus
 †Nuculites triqueter
 †Nuculopsis
 †Nuculopsis beyrichi
 †Nuculopsis elongata
 †Nuculopsis girtyi
 †Nuculopsis shumardana – or unidentified related form
 † Nyassa
 †Nyassa recta

O

  †Odonterpeton – type locality for genus
 †Odonterpeton triangulare – type locality for species
  †Odontopleura
 †Odontopteris
 †Odontopteris aequalis
 †Odontopteris brardii
 †Oehlertella
 †Oehlertella stoutella
  †Oestocephalus – type locality for genus
 †Oestocephalus amphiuminum – type locality for species
 †Ohiocrinus
 †Ohiocrinus laxus
 †Ohiocrinus oehanus
  †Olenoides
 †Onchus
 †Oncoceras
 †Onniella
 †Onychochilus
 †Onychochilus abruptum – type locality for species
 †Oomoceras
  †Ophiacodon
 †Ophiacodon uniformis – or unidentified comparable form
 †Opisthoptera
 †Opsiocrinus
 †Opsiocrinus mariae
 †Orbiculoidea
 †Orbiculoidea capuliformis
 †Orbiculoidea herzeri
 †Orbiculoidea missouriensis
 †Orbiculoidea newberryi
 †Orthis – tentative report
 †Orthoceras
 †Orthoceras trusitum
 †Orthoceras type locality for species – informal
 †Orthodesma
 †Orthodesma canaliculatum
 †Orthonema
 †Orthonema salteri
 †Orthonema subtaeniatum
 †Orthonota
 †Orthonota undulata
 †Orthonybyoceras – tentative report
 †Orthonychia
 †Orthonychia chesterense – tentative report
 †Orthonychia herzeri
 †Orthonychia infabricatus – type locality for species
 †Orthonychia parva
 †Orthonychia sciotoensis – type locality for species
 †Orthonychia waverlyensis
 †Orthopleura
 †Orthorhynchula
 †Orthorhynchula linneyi
 †Ortonella
 †Oulodus
 †Oulodus equirectis
 †Oulodus equirectus
 †Oxyprora
 †Oxyprora missouriensis
 †Ozarkodina
 †Ozarkodina bohemica
 †Ozarkodina confluens
 †Ozarkodina remscheidenesis
 †Ozarkodina sagitta
 †Ozarkodina tillmani

P

 †Pachydictya
 †Pachydictya bifurcata
 †Paiderocrinus
 †Paiderocrinus asketos
 †Paiderocrinus ochthos
 †Palacanthus
 †Palacanthus acutus
 †Palaeocapulus
 †Palaeocapulus equilateralis
 †Palaeocapulus morsei – type locality for species
 †Palaeoconcha
 †Palaeolima
 †Palaeolima retifera
 †Palaeolima triplistriata
 †Palaeoneilo
 †Palaeoneilo bedfordensis
 †Palaeoneilo bownockeri
 †Palaeoneilo constricta – or unidentified related form
 †Palaeoneilo oweni
 †Palaeonucula
 †Palaeonucula lunulata – type locality for species
 †Palaeonucula subrotundata
 †Palaeopalaemon
 †Palaeopalaemon elegans – type locality for species
 †Palaeophycus
 †Palaeoporites
 †Palaeoscenidium
 †Palaeoscenidium cladophorum
 †Palaeoscenidium quadriramosum
 †Palaeostachya
 †Palaeostachya aperta
 †Palaeostachya decacnema
 †Palaeostachya elongata
 †Palaeostachya ovalis
 †Palaeostachya trabeculata – type locality for species
 †Palaeostylus
 †Palaeostylus marvinwelleri
 †Palaeostylus minuta
 †Palaeostylus venustus
 †Palaeotrochus
 †Palaeotrochus kearnyi
 †Palaeozygopleura
 †Palaeozygopleura hamiltoniae
 †Palaeozygopleura joani
 †Palaeozygopleura laeviusculum
 †Palaeozygopleura parvula
 †Palaeozygopleura sibleyensis
 †Paleofavosites
 †Paleofavosites prolificus
 †paleoporites
 †Paleschara
 †Paliphyllum
 †Paliphyllum brassfieldense
 †Paliphyllum primarium
 †Paliphyllum regulare
 †Panderodus
 †Panderodus unicostatus
 †Paracyclas
 †Paracyclas lirata
 †Paracyclas proavia
 †Paracyrtolites
 †Paracyrtolites carinatus
 †Paragoniozona
 †Paragoniozona granulostriata – or unidentified comparable form
 †Parajuresania
 †Parajuresania nebrascensis
 †Paraliospira
 †Paraliospira rugata
 †Parallelocrinus
 †Parallelocrinus sturgeoni – type locality for species
 †Parallelodon
 †Parallelodon irvinensis
 †Parallelodon obsoletus
 †Parallelodon tenuistriatus
  †Paraspirifer
 †Paraspirifer bownockeri
 †Parazyga
 †Parvohallopora
 †Parvohallopora onealli
 †Parvohallopora ramosa
 †Pasceolus
 †Pasceolus camdenensis
 †Patellilabia
 †Patelliocrinus – type locality for genus
 †Patelliocrinus planus – type locality for species
 †Pattersonia
 †Paupospira
 †Paupospira bowdeni
 †Paupospira trilineata – type locality for species
 †Paupospira tropidophora
  †Pecopteris
 †Pecopteris arborescens
 †Pecopteris candolleana
 †Pecopteris cyathea
 †Pecopteris hemitelioides
 †Pecopteris lamuriana
 †Pecopteris miltonii
 †Pecopteris unita
 †Penniretepora
 †Penniretepora irregularis – or unidentified comparable form
 †Pennoceras
 †Pennoceras seamani
  †Pentamerus
 †Permophorus
 †Permophorus oblongus
 †Permophorus subcostatus
 †Permophorus tropidophorus
 †Pernopecten
 †Pernopecten ohioensis
 †Pernopecten prosseri
 †Peronopora
 †Peronopora decipiens
 †Petalodus
  †Petalodus ohioensis
 †Petigopora
 †Petigopora offfula
 †Petraster
 †Petrocrania
 †Petrocrania hamiltonensis
 †Petrocrania laelia
 †Petrocrania modesta
 †Petrocrania scabiosa
 †Petrozium
 †Petrozium pelagicum
 †Pharkidonotus
 †Pharkidonotus breyeri – type locality for species
 †Pharkidonotus labioreflexus – type locality for species
 †Pharkidonotus percarinatus
 †Phestia
 †Phestia inflata
 †Phestia pandoraeformis
 †Philhedra
 †Philhedra crenistriatula
    †Phlegethontia – type locality for genus
 †Phlegethontia linearis – type locality for species
 †Phlegethontia longissima – type locality for species
 †Pholadella
 †Pholadella radiata
 †Pholadomorpha
 †Pholadomorpha pholadiformis
 †Pholidops
 †Pholidostrophia
 †Pholidostrophia geniculata
 †Pholidostrophia gracilis
 †Pholidostrophia nacrea
 †Phragmoceras
 †Phragmolites
 †Phragmolites elegans – type locality for species
 †Phragmosphaera
 †Phragmosphaera lyra
 †Phylloporina
 †Phyloblatta
 †Phyloblatta jeffersoniana – type locality for species
 †Phymatopleura
 †Phymatopleura brazoensis
 †Phymatopleura nodosa
 †Phyrgilocrinus
 †Phyrgilocrinus batheri
 †Phyrtosaster – type locality for genus
 †Phyrtosaster casteri – type locality for species
 †Physonemus
 †Physonemus striatus – or unidentified comparable form
 †Physotomya
 †Pianodesma
 Pinna
 †Pinna missouriensis
 †Pityosporites
 †Pityosporites westphalensis
 †Placopterina
 †Placopterina ohioensis – type locality for species
  †Plaesiomys
 †Plaesiomys subquadrata
 †Plagiascetus – type locality for genus
 †Plagiascetus lateralis – type locality for species
 †Plagioglypta
 †Planalveolitella
 †Planalveolitella parasitica
 †Planisporites
 †Planisporites granifer
 †Planoendothyra
 †Planoendothyra associata
 †Planoendothyra evoluta
 †Planoendothyra orbiculata
 †Planoendothyra ovata – or unidentified comparable form
 †Planoendothyra whitesidei – or unidentified comparable form
  †Platyceras
 †Platyceras attenuatum
 †Platyceras bucculentum
 †Platyceras carinatum
 †Platyceras cymbium
 †Platyceras erectum
 †Platyceras lineatum
 †Platyceras nasutum
 †Platyceras rarispinum
 †Platyceras subglobosa – type locality for species
 †Platyceras thetis
 †Platycoryphe
  †Platyrhinops – type locality for genus
 †Platyrhinops lyelli – type locality for species
  †Platystrophia
 †Platystrophia actilirata
 †Platystrophia acutilirata
 †Platystrophia annieana
 †Platystrophia auburnensis
 †Platystrophia clarksvillensis
 †Platystrophia corryvillensis
 †Platystrophia crassa
 †Platystrophia cummingsi
 †Platystrophia cypha
 †Platystrophia elkhornensis
 †Platystrophia foerstei
 †Platystrophia hopensis
 †Platystrophia laticosta
 †Platystrophia moritura
 †Platystrophia morrowensis
 †Platystrophia nitida
 †Platystrophia pauciplicata
 †Platystrophia ponderosa
 †Platystrophia sublaticosta
 †Platystrophia wallowayi
 †Plectodina
 †Plectonotus
 †Plectonotus boucoti
 †Plectorthis
 †Plectorthis aequivalvis
 †Plectorthis fissicosta
 †Plectorthis jamesi
 †Plectorthis neglecta
 †Plectorthis plicatella
 †Plethospira
  †Pleurodictyum
 †Pleurodictyum cornu
 †Pleurodictyum plana
 †Pleuronotus
 †Pleuronotus decewi
 †Pleuroptyx – type locality for genus
 †Pleuroptyx clavatus – type locality for species
 †Pleurorthoceras
 †Pleurorthoceras clarksvillense
 †Plexadictyon
 †Plocezyga
 †Plocezyga acuminata
 †Plocezyga conica
 †Plocezyga cordiformis
 †Plocezyga costata – type locality for species
 †Plocezyga delicata
 †Plocezyga excellens
 †Plocezyga intermedia
 †Plocezyga lineata
 †Plocezyga lirata
 †Plocezyga markae
 †Plocezyga ornata – type locality for species
 †Plocezyga ornatissima
 †Plocezyga percostata
 †Plocezyga perminuta
 †Plocezyga regularia
 †Plocezyga subnodosa
 †Plocezyga turbinata
 †Podolithus
 †Poleumita
 †Poleumita incarinatus
 †Polidevcia
 †Polidevcia bellistriata
 †Polidevcia stevensiana
 †Polyentactinia
 †Polyentactinia craticulata
 †Polyentactinia leptosphaera
 †Polyentactinia plecta
 †Polyentactinia polygonia
  †Polygnathus
 †Polygnathus eiflius
 †Polygnathus intermedius
 †Polygnathus linguiformis
 †Polygnathus pseudofoliatus
 †Polygnathus strongi
 †Polygnathus xylus
 †Polypora
 †Polypora valida – or unidentified comparable form
 Pontocypris
 †Pontocypris acuminata
 †Poroblattina
 †Poroblattina brachyptera – type locality for species
 †Poroblattina lata – type locality for species
 †Poroblattina ohioensis – type locality for species
 †Poroblattina richmondiana – type locality for species
 †Poroblattina rotundata – type locality for species
 †Posidonia
 †Posidonia girtyi
 †Praenucula
 †Primiriopsis
 †Primiriopsis punctulifera
 †Primitia
 †Primitia cincinnatiensis
 †Primitia rudis
 †Primitiella
 †Primitiella claypolei
 †Primitiella whitfieldi
 †Probillingsites
 †Probillingsites lebanonensis
 Proboscina
 †Proboscina auloporoides
 †Proboscina frondosa
 †Proctothylacocrinus
 †Proctothylacocrinus esseri
 †Proctothylacocrinus longus
 †Productus
 †Productus semireticulatua
  †Proetus
 †Promopalaeaster
 †Promopalaeaster granulosus
 †Promopalaeaster wykoffi
 †Promytilus
 †Promytilus pottsvillensis – type locality for species
 †Propora
 †Propora conferta
 †Propora eminula
 †Prosserella
 †Prosserella lucasi
 †Prosserella subtransversa
 †Protaraea
 †Protaraea richmondensis
 †Protarea
 †Protathyris – tentative report
 †Protobalanus
 †Protobalanus spinicoronatus – type locality for species
 †Protocycloceras
 †Protocycloceras rushense
 †Protokionoceras
 †Protoleptostrophia
 †Protoleptostrophia perplana
 †Protosalvinia
 †Protosalvinia arnoldii
 †Protosalvinia ravenna
 †Protoscolex
  †Prototaxites
 †Prototaxites clevelandensis
 †Pseudaviculopecten
 †Pseudaviculopecten fasciculatus
 †Pseudaviculopecten scabridus
 †Pseudoactinodictyon
 †Pseudoactinodictyon stearni
 †Pseudoactinodictyon vagans
 †Pseudoatrypa
 †Pseudoatrypa devoniana
 †Pseudobigalea
 †Pseudobigalea crista
 †Pseudocolpomya
 †Pseudocolpomya miseneri
 †Pseudolingula
 †Pseudomonotis
 †Pseudomonotis equistriata
 †Pseudomonotis hawni
 †Pseudomonotis millhorni – type locality for species
 †Pseudomulceodens
 †Pseudomulceodens cancellatus
 †Pseudooneotodus
 †Pseudooneotodus bicornis
 †Pseudophorus
 †Pseudophorus antiquus
 †Pseudorthoceras
 †Pseudorthoceras knoxense
 †Pseudozygopleura
 †Pseudozygopleura acuminata
 †Pseudozygopleura angustata
 †Pseudozygopleura assertonsoris
 †Pseudozygopleura baltea – type locality for species
 †Pseudozygopleura cirritus
 †Pseudozygopleura contractus
 †Pseudozygopleura deloi
 †Pseudozygopleura eximia
 †Pseudozygopleura funis
 †Pseudozygopleura girtyi
 †Pseudozygopleura gradatus
 †Pseudozygopleura irrugata
 †Pseudozygopleura kellettae – or unidentified comparable form
 †Pseudozygopleura lanceolatus
 †Pseudozygopleura limus
 †Pseudozygopleura macra – or unidentified comparable form
 †Pseudozygopleura mucronatus
 †Pseudozygopleura multicostata – or unidentified comparable form
 †Pseudozygopleura pagoda – or unidentified comparable form
 †Pseudozygopleura palus – type locality for species
 †Pseudozygopleura pandus
 †Pseudozygopleura peoriense
 †Pseudozygopleura pinquicula
 †Pseudozygopleura plummeri – type locality for species
 †Pseudozygopleura pluricostata
 †Pseudozygopleura pugonis
 †Pseudozygopleura pulchra
 †Pseudozygopleura rectus
 †Pseudozygopleura schucherti – or unidentified comparable form
 †Pseudozygopleura scitula
 †Pseudozygopleura scruposus
 †Pseudozygopleura semicostata
 †Pseudozygopleura sinuosior
 †Pseudozygopleura subulatus
 †Pseudozygopleura tenuivirga
 †Pseudozygopleura variegata
 †Psiloconcha
 †Psiloconcha grandis
 †Psiloconcha inornata
 †Psiloconcha sinuata
 †Pterinea
 †Pterinea corrugatus
 †Pterinea demissa
 †Pterinopecten
 †Pterinopecten undosus
 †Pterochiton
 †Pterochiton carbonarius
 †Pterochiton spatulatus
 †Pterospermella
 †Pterospermella capitana
 †Pterospermella latibalteus
 †Pterospermella radiata
 †Pterospermella solis
 †Pterotheca
  †Pterygotus
 †Pterygotus carmani
 †Ptilodictya
 †Ptomatis
 †Ptomatis proteiforme
 †Ptotosalvinia
 †Ptotosalvinia furcata
 †Ptychocarpus
 †Ptychocrinus
 †Ptychomphalina
 †Ptychomphalina lucina
 †Ptychomphalina regulata
 †Ptychopteria
 †Ptychopteria flabellum
 †Ptychospirina
 †Ptychospirina varians
 †Ptyonius
 †Ptyonius marshii – type locality for species
 †Pugnax
 †Pugnax utah
 †Punctatisporites
 †Punctatisporites aerarius
 †Punctatisporites glaber
 †Punctatisporites minutus
 †Punctatisporites obesus
 †Punctatisporties
 †Punctatisporties minutus
 †Punctatosporites
 †Punctatosporites granifer
 †Punctatosporites minutus
 †Punctatosporites rotundus
 †Punctospirifer
 †Punctospirifer kentuckensis
 †Pustula
 †Pustula pertenuis
 †Pustulisphaeridium
 †Pustulisphaeridium levibrachium
 †Pyanomya
 †Pycnocrinus
 †Pyrenomeous

Q

 †Quadrijugator

R

 †Rafinesquina
 †Rafinesquina alternata
 †Rafinesquina loxorhytis
 †Rafinesquina ponderosa
 †Rafinesquina squamula
 †Raistrickia
 †Raistrickia crinita
 †Raistrickia srinita
 †Ramphoprion
 †Raphistoma
 †Rasmussenoceras
 †Reinschospora
 †Reinschospora magnifica
 †Renalcis
 †Reptaria
 †Reptaria stolonifera
 †Reteocrinus
 †Reteporina
 †Reteporina striata
 †Retichonetes
 †Reticulatisporites
 †Reticulatisporites muricatus
 †Retispira
 †Retispira fascireticulatus – type locality for species
 †Retispira tenuilineata
 †Retispira waverliensis
 †Retrorsirostra
 †Retrorsirostra carleyi
 †Rhachicrinus
 †Rhachicrinus wrighti
 †Rhachiopteris
 †Rhapanocrinus
 †Rhegmaphyllum
 †Rhegmaphyllum daytonensis
 †Rhinidictya
 †Rhinocaris
 †Rhinocaris ehlersi
 †Rhipidomella
 †Rhipidomella pecosi
 †Rhipidomella penelope – or unidentified comparable form
 †Rhipidomella trigona
 †Rhipidomella vanuxemi
 †Rhipidothyris
  †Rhizocorallium
 †Rhombodictyon
 †Rhombopora
 †Rhombopora lepidodendroides
 †Rhombotrypa
 †Rhombotrypa subquadrata
 †Rhopolonaria
 †Rhopolonaria venosa
 †Rhynchopora
 †Rhynchotrema
 †Rhynchotrema denatum
 †Rhynchotrema dentatum
 †Rhynchotreta
 †Rhytimya
 †Rhytimya compressa
 †Rhytimya faberi
 †Rhytimya lunulata
 †Rhytimya oehana
 †Rhytimya radiata
 †Richmondoceras
 †Richmondoceras brevicameratum
 †Rizoceras
 †Ropalonaria
 †Royalella
 †Royalella quadrolirata – type locality for species
 †Royalella swallowiana – type locality for species
 †Ruedemannia
 †Ruedemannia trilix – type locality for species
 †Rugomena
 †Rugomena vetusta
 †Rugosochonetes
  †Rusophycus
 †Rusophycus biloba

S

 †Saccella
 †Saccella parva
 †Salpingostoma
 †Salpingostoma richmondensis – tentative report
 †Samaropsis
 †Sanguinolites
 †Sanguinolites cuneatus
 †Sanguinolites hekitoensis – type locality for species
  †Sauropleura – type locality for genus
 †Sauropleura pectinata – type locality for species
 †Schellwienella
 †Schistoceras
 †Schizambon – tentative report
 †Schizoblatta – type locality for genus
 †Schizoblatta alutacea – type locality for species
 †Schizocrania
 †Schizocrania filosa
 †Schizodus
 †Schizodus acuminatus – type locality for species
 †Schizodus affinis
 †Schizodus appressus
 †Schizodus chesterensis – or unidentified comparable form
 †Schizodus curtus
 †Schizodus subcircularis
 †Schizodus wheeleri
 †Schizolopha
 †Schizophoria
 †Schizophoria ferronensis
 †Schizophoria impressa
 †Schlotheimophyllum
 †Schlotheimophyllum benedicti
 †Schlotheimophyllum patellatum
 †Schuchertella
 †Schuchertella interstriata
 †Schuchertoceras
 †Scolithos
 †Scolithos laxata
 †Sedgwickia – tentative report
 †Semicoscinium
 †Semipora – tentative report
 †Semipora ehlersi
 †Septopora
 †Septopora biserialis
 †Septopora robusta
 †Serpulites
 †Serpulospira
 †Serpulospira diversiformis
 †Sevillia
 †Sevillia sevillensis
 †Sevillia trinucleata
 †Shansiella
 †Shansiella beckwithana
 †Shansiella carbonaria
 †Shansiella insecta
 †Shideleroceras
   †Sigillaria
 †Sigillaria brardii
 †Sigillaria elegans
 †Sigillaria ficoides
 †Sigillaria lacoei
 †Sigillaria laurenciana
 †Sigillaria mamillaris
 †Sigillaria orbicularis
 †Sigillaria pileata – type locality for species
 †Sigillaria rugosa
 †Sigillariostrobus
 †Silfonocrinus
 †Silfonocrinus siluricus
 †Silicaster
 †Silicaster esseri
 †Similodonta – tentative report
 †Sinuites
 †Sinuites cancellatus
 †Sinuites granistriatus
 †Sinuites subcompressa
  Solemya
 †Solemya radiata
 †Solemya sharonensis – type locality for species
 †Soleniscus
 †Soleniscus aplatus – type locality for species
 †Soleniscus klipparti
 †Soleniscus primigenia
 †Soleniscus primogenium
 †Soleniscus regularis
 †Soleniscus typicus
 †Solenomorpha
 †Solenomorpha lamborni
 †Solisphaeridium
 †Solisphaeridium astrum
 †Solisphaeridium clavum
 †Solisphaeridium folliculum
 †Solisphaeridium rigispinosum
 †Sowerbyella
 †Sowerbyella rugosa
 †Spatiopora
 †Sphenolium
 †Sphenophragmus
 †Sphenophragmus nanus – or unidentified comparable form
  †Sphenophyllum
 †Sphenophyllum majus
 †Sphenophyllum oblongifolium
  †Sphenopteris
 †Sphenopteris elegans – or unidentified comparable form
 †Sphenopteris minutisecta
 †Sphenosphaera
 †Sphenosphaera centervillensis – type locality for species
 †Sphenosphaera fiscellostriata – type locality for species
 †Sphenosphaera opertus – type locality for species
 †Sphenosphaera recurvus – type locality for species
  †Sphenothallus
 †Spiloblattina
 †Spiloblattina variegata – type locality for species
 †Spinocyrtia
 †Spinocyrtia euryteines – report made of unidentified related form or using admittedly obsolete nomenclature
 †Spinosporites
 †Spinosporites exiguus
 †Spinulicosta
 †Spinulicosta spinulicosta
 †Spinyplatyceras
 †Spinyplatyceras dumosum
  †Spirifer
 †Spirifer opimus
 †Spirifer pennatus
 †Spiromphalus
 †Spiromphalus pervius – type locality for species
 Spiropteris
 Spirorbis
 †Spirorbis arkonensis
 †Spirorbis planum
 †Spiroscala
 †Spiroscala solida
 †Spongentactinella
 †Spongentactinella veles
 †Sporangites
 †Sporangites huronensis
 †Spyroceras
 †Staufferoceras
 †Stegocoelia
 †Stegocoelia copei – or unidentified comparable form
 †Stegops
 †Stegops newberryi – type locality for species
 †Stellinium
 †Stellinium cristatum
 †Stellinium inflatum
 †Stellinium octoaster
 †Stelodictyon
 †Stereoaster
 †Stereoaster squamosus
 †Stereostylus
 †Stereostylus amesensis
 †Stereotoechus
 †Stereotoechus typicus – or unidentified comparable form
   †Stethacanthus
 †Stethacanthus altonensis
 †Stibarocrinus
 †Stibarocrinus centervillensis
 †Stictoporella
 †Stictoporina
 †Stictoporina granulifera
 †Stigmatella
 †Stigmatella catenulata
 †Stigmatella crenulata
 †Stigmatella dychei
 Stomatopora
 †Straparollus
 †Straparollus hecale – or unidentified comparable form
 †Straparollus rudis – or unidentified comparable form
 †Strataster
 †Strataster devonicus
 †Streblochondria
 †Streblopteria
 †Streblopteria oklahomensis
 †Streblotrypa
 †Streblotrypa anomala
 †Streblotrypa hamiltonensis
 †Streptaster
 †Streptaster vorticellatus
 †Streptelasma
 †Streptelasma divaricans
 †Striatopora
 †Striatopora flexuosa
 †Striatopora intermittens
 †Strobeus
 †Strobeus brevis
 †Strobeus immanis
 †Strobeus intercalaris
 †Strobeus paludinaeformis
 †Stromatocerium
 †Stromatocerium granulosum
 †Stromatopora
 †Strombodes
 †Strombodes socialis
 †Strophalosia
 †Strophalosia truncata
 †Stropheodonta
 †Stropheodonta demissa
 †Strophodonta
 †Strophodonta demissa – report made of unidentified related form or using admittedly obsolete nomenclature
   †Strophomena
 †Strophomena concordensis
 †Strophomena erratica
 †Strophomena extenuata
 †Strophomena maysvillensis
 †Strophomena neglecta
 †Strophomena nutans
 †Strophomena planoconvexa
 †Strophomena planumbona
 †Strophomena sulcata
 †Strophostylus
 †Sturgeonospira – type locality for genus
 †Sturgeonospira tortula – type locality for species
 †Stygetoblatta – type locality for genus
 †Stygetoblatta latipennis – type locality for species
 †Styliolina
 †Styliolina fissurella
 †Stylonema
 †Stylonema robusta
 †Subulites
 †Subulites planilateralis – type locality for species
 †Sulcoretepora
 †Sulcoretepora deissi
 †Sulcoretepora incisurata
 †Synhomalonotus
 †Syntomopterus
 †Syntomopterus richardsoni
  †Syringopora – tentative report
 †Syringopora reteformis
 †Syringostroma
 †Syringostroma cylindricum
 †Syringostroma densum
 †Syringostroma nodulatum
 †Syringostroma pustulosum
 †Syringothyris
 †Syringothyris bedfordensis
 †Syscioblatta
 †Syscioblatta anomala – type locality for species
 †Syscioblatta minor – type locality for species
 †Syscioblatta misera – type locality for species
 †Syscioblatta obscura – type locality for species
 †Syscioblatta steubenvilleana – type locality for species
 †Sysciophlebia
 †Sysciophlebia acutipennis – type locality for species
 †Sysciophlebia adumbrata – type locality for species
 †Sysciophlebia affinis – type locality for species
 †Sysciophlebia balteata
 †Sysciophlebia benedicta – type locality for species
 †Sysciophlebia hybrida – type locality for species
 †Sysciophlebia nana – type locality for species
 †Sysciophlebia obtusa – type locality for species
 †Sysciophlebia picta – type locality for species
 †Sysciophlebia rotundata – type locality for species
 †Sysciophlebia schucherti – type locality for species
 †Sysciophlebia scudderi – type locality for species
 †Sysciophlebia variegata – type locality for species
 †Sysciophlebia whitei – type locality for species

T

 †Taeniaster
 †Taeniaster elegans
 †Taeniopteris
 †Taeniopteris lescuriana
 †Taeniopteris newberriana
 †Tamiobatis
 †Tamiobatis vetustus
 †Tanaocrinus
 †Tasmanites
 †Technophora
 †Technophorus – type locality for genus
 †Technophorus faberi – type locality for species
  †Teichichnus
 †Temnocheilus
 †Temnocheilus forbesianus
   †Tentaculites
 †Tentaculites bellulus
 †Tentaculites gracilistriatus
 †Tetradium
 †Tetranota
 †Tetranota bidorsata
 †Tetrentactinia
 †Tetrentactinia barysphaera
 †Tetrentactinia gracilispinosa
 †Tetrentactinia quadrispinosa
 †Tetrentactinia somphosphaera
 †Tetrentactinia somphozona
 †Tetrentactinia spongacea
 †Tetrentactinia teuchestes
 †Thamnoptychia
 †Thamnoptychia alpenensis
 †Thamnoptychia labyrinthica
 †Thamnoptychia minuitissima
 †Thamnoptychia projecta – tentative report
 †Thamnoptychia silicensis
 †Thymospora
 †Thymospora obscura
 †Thymospora pseudothiessenii
 †Tirocrinus
 †Tirocrinus trochos
 †Tomoceras
 †Tomoceras gilliana – or unidentified comparable form
 †Torispora
 †Torispora securis
 †Tornacia
 †Tornacia stela
 †Tornoceras
 †Tornoceras uniagnulare
 †Tornoceras uniangulare
 †Toryniferella
 †Trachydomia
 †Tremanotus
 †Trematis
 †Trematis millepunctata
 †Trematis millepuntata
 †Trematis reticularis
 †Trematopora
 †Trepospira
 †Trepospira illinoisensis
  †Treptoceras
 †Treptoceras byrnesi
 †Treptoceras cincinnatiensis
 †Treptoceras duseri
 †Treptoceras fosteri
    †Triarthrus
 †Triendoceras – tentative report
 †Triendoceras davisi
 †Trigonoglossa
 †Trigonoglossa nebrascensis
 †Trigrammaria
 †Trilonche
 †Trilonche cancellicula
 †Trilonche prolata
 †Trimerella
 †Triquitrites
 †Triquitrites additus
 †Triquitrites bransonii
 †Triquitrites crassus
 †Triquitrites minutus
 †Triquitrites sculptilis
 †Triquitrites spinosus
 †Triquitrites subspinosus – or unidentified comparable form
 †Triquitrites tribullatus
 †Trocholites
 †Trochonema
 †Trochonemopsis
 †Trochonemopsis meekanum
 †Troedssonoceras
 †Tropidodiscus
 †Tropidodiscus vesculilineatus – type locality for species
 †Tropidoleptus
 †Tropidoleptus carinatus
 †Truncatiramus – now regarded as a jr. synonym of Erettopterus
 †Truncatiramus perryensis
 Trypetesa
 †Trypetesa caveata
 †Trypherocrinus
 †Trypherocrinus brassfieldensis
 †Tuberculatosporites
 †Tuberculatosporites robustus
  †Tuditanus – type locality for genus
 †Tuditanus punctulatus – type locality for species
 †Turbocrinus
 †Turbocrinus paunctum
 †Turbonopsis
 †Turbonopsis shumardii
 †Typanocrinus
 †Typanocrinus strombos

U

 †Ulrichia
 †Ulrichia nodosa
 †Umbotropis
 †Umbotropis filitexta – type locality for species
 †Uncinisphaera
 †Uncinisphaera lappa
 †Unellium
 †Unellium ampullium
 †Unellium elongatum
 †Unellium oscitans
 †Unklesbayella – type locality for genus
 †Unklesbayella geinitzi
  †Urasterella
 †Urasterella grandis

V

 †Vanuxemia
 †Vanuxemia waynesvillensis – type locality for species
 †Vaupelia
 †Vermiforichnus
 †Vermiforichnus clarkei – or unidentified comparable form
 †Verrucosisporites
 †Verrucosisporites cerosus
 †Verrucosisporites donarii
 †Verrucosisporites henshawensis
 †Verrucosisporites microtuberosus
 †Verrucosisporites microtuerosus
 †Verrucosisporites verrucosus
 †Veryhachium
 †Veryhachium roscidum
 †Veryhachium trispinosoides
 †Vesicaspora
 †Vesicaspora wilsonii
 †Vestispora
 †Vestispora fenestrata
 †Vestispora laevigata
 †Vinella
 †Vinlandostrophia
 †Vinlandostrophia acutilirata
 †Vinlandostrophia ponderosa
 †Vorticina
 †Vorticina cyrtolites

W

 †Waagenella
 †Waagenella crassus
   †Walchia
 †Walchiostrobus
 †Walliserodus
 †Walliserodus sancticlairi
 †Welleria – tentative report
 †Westonoceras
 †Whidbornella
 †Whiteavesia
 †Whitfieldella
 †Whitfieldoceras
 †Wilkingia
 †Wilkingia andrewsi
 †Wilkingia maxvillensis
 †Wilkingia terminale
 †Wilsonites
 †Wilsonites vesicatus
 †Worthenia
 †Worthenia parvula
 †Worthenia speciosa
 †Worthenia strigillata
 †Worthenia tabulata
 †Wurmiella
 †Wurmiella excavata

X

 †Xenocrinus
  †Xyloiulus
 †Xyloiulus bairdi – type locality for species
 †Xysmacrinus
 †Xysmacrinus greenensis

Z

 †Zascinaspis
 †Zirocrinus
 †Zirocrinus litos
 †Zittelloceras
 †Zonalosporites
 †Zonalosporites ellipticus
  †Zoophycos
 †Zygocycloides
 †Zygocycloides magnus
 †Zygospira
 †Zygospira cincinnatiensis
 †Zygospira modesta

References

 

Paleozoic
Life
Ohio
Ohio-related lists